John Chapman (September 26, 1774March 18, 1845), better known as Johnny Appleseed, was an American pioneer nurseryman, who introduced apple trees to large parts of Pennsylvania, Ohio, Indiana, Illinois, and present-day Ontario, as well as the northern counties of present-day West Virginia. He became an American legend while still alive, due to his kind, generous ways, his leadership in conservation, and the symbolic importance he attributed to apples. He was also a missionary for The New Church (Swedenborgian) and the inspiration for many museums and historical sites such as the Johnny Appleseed Museum in Urbana, Ohio.

Family
Chapman was born on September 26, 1774, in Leominster, Massachusetts, the second child of Nathaniel and Elizabeth Chapman (née Simonds, married February 8, 1770). His birthplace has a granite marker, and the street is now called Johnny Appleseed Lane.

Chapman's mother, Elizabeth, died in 1776, shortly after giving birth to a second son, Nathaniel Jr., who died a few days later. In 1780, his father, Nathaniel, who was in the military, returned to Longmeadow, Massachusetts, where, in the summer of the same year, he married Lucy Cooley.

Author Rosella Rice stated, "Johnny had one sister, Persis Broom, of Indiana. She was not at all like him; a very ordinary woman, talkative, and free in her frequent, 'says she's' and 'says I's.'"

According to some accounts, an 18-year-old John persuaded his 11-year-old half-brother Nathaniel Cooley Chapman to go west with him in 1792. The duo apparently lived a nomadic life until their father brought his large family west in 1805 and met up with them in Ohio. The younger Nathaniel decided to stay and help their father farm the land.

Shortly after the brothers parted ways, John began his apprenticeship as an orchardist under a Mr. Crawford, who grew apples, thus inspiring Chapman's life journey of planting apple trees. In 1800, at the age of 26, Chapman was in Licking River, Ohio. His first orchard was on the farm of Isaac Stadden in Licking County. In 1806, he embarked upon a canoe voyage down the Ohio, Muskingum, and Walhonding rivers, using two canoes lashed together to transport himself and his seeds.

Life

There are stories of Johnny Appleseed practicing his nurseryman craft in the area of Wilkes-Barre, Pennsylvania, and of picking seeds from the pomace at Potomac River cider mills in the late 1790s. Another story has Chapman living in Pittsburgh on Grant's Hill in 1794 at the time of the Whiskey Rebellion.

The popular image is of Johnny Appleseed spreading apple seeds randomly everywhere he went. In fact, he planted nurseries rather than orchards, built fences around them to protect them from livestock, left the nurseries in the care of a neighbor who sold trees on shares, and returned every year or two to tend the nursery. He planted his first nursery on the bank of Brokenstraw Creek, south of Warren, Pennsylvania. Next, he seems to have moved to Venango County, along the shore of French Creek, but many of these nurseries were in the Mohican River area of north-central Ohio. This area included the towns of Mansfield, Lisbon, Lucas, Perrysville and Loudonville.

In 1817, a bulletin of the Church of New Jerusalem printed in Manchester, England, was the first to publish a written report about Chapman. It described a missionary who traveled around the West to sow apple seeds and pass out books of the New Church.

In 1819, Chapman was nearly killed in an accident in Ohio. One morning he was picking his crops in a tree when he fell and caught his neck in the fork of the tree. Shortly after he fell, one of his helpers, eight-year-old John White, found him struggling in the tree. Unable to get him out of the tree, young John White cut the tree down, saving Chapman's life.

In 1822, the first known use of "John Appleseed" was written in a letter from a member of the New Church.

According to Harper's New Monthly Magazine, toward the end of his career he was present when an itinerant missionary was exhorting an open-air congregation in Mansfield, Ohio. The sermon was long and severe on the topic of extravagance, because the pioneers were buying such indulgences as calico and imported tea. "Where now is there a man who, like the primitive Christians, is traveling to heaven barefooted and clad in coarse raiment?" the preacher repeatedly asked, until Johnny Appleseed, his endurance worn out, walked up to the preacher, put his bare foot on the stump that had served as a pulpit, and said, "Here's your primitive Christian!" The flummoxed sermonizer dismissed the congregation.

Author Rosella Rice, who met Chapman in his later years, stated in the 1863 History of Ashland County, Ohio:His personal appearance was as singular as his character. He was a small, "chunked" man, quick and restless in his motions and conversation; his beard, though not long, was unshaven, and his hair was long and dark, and his eye black and sparkling. He lived the roughest life, and often slept in the woods. His clothing was mostly old, being generally given to him in exchange for apple-trees. He went bare-footed, and often traveled miles through the snow in that way...[He] wore on his head a tin utensil which answered both as a cap and a mush pot...Historian Paul Aron argues, "Chapman was actually a successful businessman. He bought many of the parcels of land on which he planted his seeds and ultimately accumulated about twelve hundred acres across three states...He wore pauper's clothing by choice and not out of necessity."

Chapman would tell stories to children and spread New Church gospel to the adults, receiving in return a floor to sleep on for the night, and sometimes supper. Rice stated, "We can hear him read now, just as he did that summer day, when we were busy quilting upstairs, and he lay near the door, his voice rising denunciatory and thrilling—strong and loud as the roar of wind and waves, then soft and soothing as the balmy airs that quivered the morning-glory leaves about his gray beard. His was a strange eloquence at times, and he was undoubtedly a man of genius. 
He made several trips back East, both to visit his sister and to replenish his supply of Swedenborgian literature.

He cared very deeply about animals, including insects. Henry Howe visited all the counties in Ohio in the early nineteenth century and collected several stories from the 1830s, when Johnny Appleseed was still alive:One cool autumnal night, while lying by his camp-fire in the woods, he observed that the mosquitoes flew in the blaze and were burned. Johnny, who wore on his head a tin utensil which answered both as a cap and a mush pot, filled it with water and quenched the fire, and afterwards remarked, "God forbid that I should build a fire for my comfort, that should be the means of destroying any of His creatures."

Another time, he allegedly made a camp-fire in a snowstorm at the end of a hollow log in which he intended to pass the night but found it occupied by a bear and cubs, so he removed his fire to the other end and slept on the snow in the open air, rather than disturb the bear.In a story collected by Eric Braun, he had a pet wolf that had started following him after he healed its injured leg.

More controversially, he also planted dogfennel during his travels, believing that it was a useful medicinal herb. It is now regarded as a noxious, invasive weed.

According to another story, he heard that a horse was to be put down, so he bought the horse, bought a few grassy acres nearby, and turned it out to recover. When it did, he gave the horse to someone needy, exacting a promise to treat it humanely.

During his later life, he was a vegetarian. Chapman chose not to marry, as he believed he would find his soulmate in Heaven if she did not appear to him on Earth.

Death

Different dates are listed for his death. Harper's New Monthly Magazine of November 1871 was apparently incorrect in saying that he died in mid-1847, though this is taken by many as the primary source of information about John Chapman. Multiple Indiana newspapers reported his death date as March 18, 1845. The Goshen Democrat published a death notice for him in its March 27, 1845, edition, citing the day of death as March 18 of that year. The paper's death notice read: 

The Fort Wayne Sentinel printed his obituary on March 22, 1845, saying that he died on March 18:

Rosella Rice wrote in 1863:He died near Fort Wayne, Indiana, in 1846 or 1848, a stranger among strangers, who kindly cared for him. He died the death of the righteous, calmly and peacefully, and with little suffering or pain. So long as his memory lives will a grateful people say: "He went about doing good."The site of his grave is also disputed. Developers of the Canterbury Green apartment complex and golf course in Fort Wayne, Indiana, claim that his grave is there, marked by a rock. That is where the Worth cabin sat in which he died. 

Steven Fortriede, director of the Allen County Public Library (ACPL) and author of the 1978 Johnny Appleseed, believes that another gravesite is the correct site, in Johnny Appleseed Park in Fort Wayne. Johnny Appleseed Park is a Fort Wayne city park that adjoins Archer Park, an Allen County park. Archer Park is the site of John Chapman's grave marker and used to be a part of the Archer family farm.

The Worth family attended First Baptist Church in Fort Wayne, according to records at ACPL, which has one of the nation's top genealogy collections. According to an 1858 interview with Richard Worth Jr., Chapman was buried "respectably" in the Archer cemetery, and Fortriede believes that use of the term "respectably" indicates that Chapman was buried in the hallowed ground of Archer cemetery instead of near the cabin where he died.

John H. Archer, grandson of David Archer, wrote in a letter dated October 4, 1900: 

In 1934, a committee of the Johnny Appleseed Commission Council of the City of Fort Wayne reported, "[A]s a part of the celebration of Indiana's 100th birthday in 1916 an iron fence was placed in the Archer graveyard by the Horticulture Society of Indiana setting off the grave of Johnny Appleseed. At that time, there were men living who had attended the funeral of Johnny Appleseed. Direct and accurate evidence was available then. There was little or no reason for them to make a mistake about the location of this grave. They located the grave in the Archer burying ground."

Legacy
He also owned four plots in Allen County, Indiana, including a nursery in Milan Township with 15,000 trees, and two plots in Mount Vernon, Ohio. He bought the southwest quarter (160 acres) of section 26, Mohican Township, Ashland County, Ohio, but did not record the deed and lost the property.

The financial panic of 1837 took a toll on his estate. Trees brought only two or three cents each, as opposed to the "fippenny bit" (about six and a quarter cents) that he usually got. Some of his land was sold to pay taxes following his death, and litigation used up much of the rest.

In 1880, abolitionist author Lydia Maria Child mythologized Appleseed in a poem:

In 1921, 1923, 1927, and 1928, American song poet Vachel Lindsay published poems about Johnny Appleseed. One of these poems was the source text for Eunice Lea Kettering's prize-winning choral-orchestral composition Johnny Appleseed. Gail Kubik composed a work for bass, chorus and orchestra called In Praise of Johnny Appleseed; this work was also based on the eponymous Vachel Lindsay poem, and entered into the same 1942 National Federation of Music Clubs composition competition as Kettering's work. 

In 1933, poets Rosemary Carr Benét and Stephen Vincent Benét mythologized Appleseed in children's poem book A Book of Americans.

In Disney's 1948 film Melody Time, Appleseed is featured in an animated musical segment titled "The Legend of Johnny Appleseed".

Since 1975 in Fort Wayne, Indiana, the Johnny Appleseed Festival has been held the third full weekend in September in Johnny Appleseed Park and in Archer Park. Musicians, demonstrators, and vendors dress in early-19th-century attire and offer food and beverages that would have been available then. Similar festivals are held in Sheffield, PA; Apple Creek, OH; Crystal Lake, IL; Lisbon, OH; and Paradise, CA.

In 2008 the Fort Wayne Wizards, a minor-league baseball club, changed their name to the Fort Wayne TinCaps. In their first season with the new name, 2009, the Tincaps won their only league championship. The name "Tincaps" refers to the tin hat (or pot) which Johnny Appleseed allegedly wore. The team mascot is named "Johnny".

From 1962 to 1980, a high-school athletic league made up of schools from around the Mansfield, Ohio, area used the name the "Johnny Appleseed Conference".  

In 1966, the U.S. Postal Service issued a 5-cent stamp commemorating Johnny Appleseed.

A memorial in Spring Grove Cemetery in Cincinnati, Ohio, stands on the summit of the grounds in Section 134. A circular garden surrounds a large stone upon which a bronze statue of Chapman stands, face looking skywards, holding an apple-seedling tree in one hand and a book in the other. A bronze cenotaph identifies him as Johnny Appleseed and gives a brief biography and eulogy.

March 11 and September 26 are sometimes celebrated as Johnny Appleseed Day. The September date is Appleseed's acknowledged birthdate, but the March date is sometimes preferred because it falls during planting season.

Johnny Appleseed Elementary School is a public school in Leominster, Massachusetts, his birthplace. Mansfield, Ohio, one of Appleseed's stops in his peregrinations, was home to Johnny Appleseed Middle School until it closed in 1989.

In 1984, Jill and Michael Gallina published a biographical musical, Johnny Appleseed.

In 2016, John Chapman appeared in Tracy Chevalier's historical fiction novel At the Edge of the Orchard.

A large terracotta sculpture of Johnny Appleseed, created by Viktor Schreckengost (1906-2008), adorns the front of the Lakewood High School Civic Auditorium in Lakewood, Ohio. Although the local board of education deemed Appleseed too "eccentric" a figure to grace the front of the building (renaming the sculpture simply "Early Settler"), students, teachers, and parents alike still call the sculpture by its intended name: "Johnny Appleseed".  

Urbana University in Urbana, Ohio, maintains one of two Johnny Appleseed museums in the world, which is open to the public. The Johnny Appleseed Educational Center and  Museum hosts a number of artifacts, including a tree that is believed to have been planted by Johnny Appleseed. They also provide a number of services for research, including a national registry of Johnny Appleseed's relatives. In 2011 the museum was renovated and updated.  The educational center and museum was founded on the belief that those who have the opportunity to study the life of Johnny Appleseed will share his appreciation of education, his country, the environment, peace, moral integrity, and leadership.

Supposedly, the only surviving tree planted by Johnny Appleseed grows on the farm of Richard and Phyllis Algeo of Nova, Ohio. Some marketers claim that it is a Rambo; some even make the claim that the Rambo was "Johnny Appleseed's favorite variety", ignoring the fact that he had religious objections to grafting and preferred wild apples to all named varieties. It appears that most nurseries are calling the tree the "Johnny Appleseed" variety, rather than a Rambo. Unlike the mid-summer Rambo, the Johnny Appleseed variety ripens in September and is a baking-applesauce variety similar to an Albemarle Pippin. Nurseries offer the Johnny Appleseed tree as an immature apple tree for planting, with scions from the Algeo stock grafted on them.
Orchardists do not appear to be marketing the fruit of this tree.

Apple cider 
Author Michael Pollan believes that since Chapman was against grafting, his apples were not of an edible variety and could be used only for cider: "Really, what Johnny Appleseed was doing and the reason he was welcome in every cabin in Ohio and Indiana was he was bringing the gift of alcohol to the frontier. He was our American Dionysus."

See also
 Melody Time
 Folk hero
 The Man Who Planted Trees
 Seed bombing
 Silviculture
 Tree planting

References

Citations

Further reading
 William Kerrigan, Johnny Appleseed and the American Orchard: A Cultural History. Baltimore, MD: Johns Hopkins University Press, 2012.

External links

 "The Appleseed Walk" an homage to the legacy of Johnny Appleseed
 "Johnny Appleseed: A Pioneer Hero" from Harper's Magazine, November 1871.
 Johnny Appleseed Festival in Sheffield, PA
 Searching for Johnny film documentary by director Miroslav Mandic
 Searching for Johnny  Official movie site
 "Johnny Appleseed Trail in North Central MA"

 
1774 births
1845 deaths
American Christian missionaries
American folklore
American orchardists
American people of English descent
American pioneers
American Swedenborgians
Apples
Burials in Indiana
Childfree
Christian vegetarianism
Deaths from pneumonia in Indiana
History of Fort Wayne, Indiana
Ohio folklore
People from Venango County, Pennsylvania
Pennsylvania folklore
People from Leominster, Massachusetts
Tall tales